Eugène Vinaver ( Yevgeniĭ Maksimovich Vinaver, 18 June 1899 – 21 July 1979) was a Russian-born British literary scholar who is best known today for his edition of the works of Sir Thomas Malory.

Early life 
Vinaver was born in Saint Petersburg, the son of Jewish-Russian lawyer, national politician, and Jewish community leader Maxim Vinaver, who emigrated to France in 1919.

Eugene Vinaver studied at the  École pratique des hautes études in Paris, where he was a pupil of Joseph Bédier.

Life in England 
From the late 1920s, he lived in England (one of his teachers was Mildred Pope) and in 1933 he was appointed Professor of French Language and Literature at the University of Manchester. He received his doctorate from Oxford University in 1950.

In 1928, Vinaver founded in Oxford the Arthurian Society, which published two volumes under the title Arthuriana (1929, 1930). This society was renamed the Society for the Study of the Medieval Languages and Literatures. Arthuriana became Medium Aevum. In 1948, the International Arthurian Society was organized by Eugène Vinaver and Jean Frappier.

In 1947, Eugène Vinaver published a new edition of Malory's Morte d'Arthur, based on the 15th-century Winchester Manuscript which W.F. Oakeshott had discovered in the Fellows' Library at Winchester College in 1934. He noted the structural differences between the text in the manuscript and Caxton's edition of Morte d'Arthur, such as chapter headings and divisions, and wording changes.

In addition to his interest in Arthurian legend, Vinaver was also a recognised authority on Racine and Flaubert.

Vinaver was a correspondent member of the British Academy, laureate of the French Academy of Sciences, and the Medieval Academy of America, and a foreign member of Académie royale de langue et de littérature française of Belgium. He was awarded the Order of the Legion of Honor.

Vinaver died in Kent on 21 July 1979 of malignant lymphoma.

Selected works 
 French translation of the Russian lyrics to Lazare Saminsky's opera La Galliarde d'une Peste Joyeuse, 1924
 The Works of Sir Thomas Malory (three volumes), 1947
 The Works of Sir Thomas Malory (one volume), 1954
 Form and Meaning in Medieval Romance, 1966
 À la recherche d'une poétique médiévale, 1970
 The Rise of Romance, 1971

References 

 Oxford Dictionary of National Biography
 Biography 
 International Arthurian Society; Archives of the Society

Writers from Paris
1899 births
1979 deaths
French scholars
Arthurian scholars
University of Paris alumni
Jews from the Russian Empire
French medievalists
École pratique des hautes études alumni
Comparative literature academics
Alumni of the University of Oxford
Winners of the Prix Broquette-Gonin (literature)
Emigrants from the Russian Empire to France
Academics of the University of Manchester
English literature academics
Chevaliers of the Légion d'honneur
Corresponding Fellows of the Medieval Academy of America
Corresponding Fellows of the British Academy